The 1927–28 season was the thirty-third season in which Dundee competed at a Scottish national level, playing in Division One. After a poor start, manager Alec McNair was replaced by Sandy MacFarlane in his 2nd stint, who led the Dark Blues to finish in 14th place. Dundee would also compete in the Scottish Cup, where they would make it to the 3rd round before being knocked out by Dunfermline Athletic. The club would also wear black shorts occasionally as a change kit.

Scottish Division One 

Statistics provided by Dee Archive.

League table

Scottish Cup 

Statistics provided by Dee Archive.

Player Statistics 
Statistics provided by Dee Archive

|}

See also 

 List of Dundee F.C. seasons

References

External links 

 1927-28 Dundee season on Fitbastats

Dundee F.C. seasons
Dundee